
Niwa or NIWA may refer to:

Places
 Niwa Station, Beijing Subway
Niwa District, Aichi, a district in Japan

In Poland
Niwa, Lower Silesian Voivodeship (south-west Poland)
Niwa, Łódź Voivodeship (central Poland)
Niwa, Puławy County in Lublin Voivodeship (east Poland)
Niwa, Zamość County in Lublin Voivodeship (east Poland)
Niwa, Lubaczów County in Subcarpathian Voivodeship (south-east Poland)
Niwa, Tarnobrzeg County in Subcarpathian Voivodeship (south-east Poland)
Niwa, Masovian Voivodeship (east-central Poland)
Niwa, Opole Voivodeship (south-west Poland)

Other uses
Niwa (surname)
Niwa clan, a Japanese samurai clan
Daisuke Niwa, Emiko Niwa, Kosuke Niwa and Daiki Niwa, phantom thieves in manga series D.N.Angel
National Institute of Water and Atmospheric Research of New Zealand

See also

Nina (name)
Niña (name)

Japanese-language surnames